Shahrak-e Vali-ye Asr (also Romanized as Shahrak-e Valī-ye ‘Aşr; also known as Mey Gholāmak) is a village in Bandar-e Emam Khomeyni Rural District, Bandar-e Emam Khomeyni District, Mahshahr County, Khuzestan Province, Iran. At the 2006 census, its population was 862, in 179 families.

References 

Populated places in Mahshahr County